USS Plunger (SS-2) was one of the earliest submarines of the United States Navy.  She was the lead boat of her class and was later renamed A-1 when she was designated an A-type submarine.  She is not to be confused with the experimental submarine Plunger which was evaluated by the U.S. Navy from 1898 to 1900, but not accepted or commissioned.

Early service 
Plunger was originally laid down on 21 May 1901 at Elizabethport, New Jersey, at Lewis Nixon's Crescent Shipyard. Arthur Leopold Busch supervised the construction of the A-Class submarines built there. The prototype Fulton experimental craft was laid down at Isaac Rice's Electric Boat Company prior to these first A-class submarines.

She was launched on 1 February 1902, and commissioned at the Holland Torpedo Boat Company yard at Holland Torpedo Boat Station, New Suffolk, New York on 19 September 1903.

Assigned to the Naval Torpedo Station at Newport, Rhode Island for experimental torpedo work, Plunger operated locally from that facility for the next two years, a period of time broken only by an overhaul at the Holland yard at New Suffolk from March to November 1904. Besides testing machinery, armament and tactics, the submarine torpedo boat also served as a training ship for the crews of new submersibles emerging from the builder's yards.

In August 1905, Plunger underwent two weeks of upkeep before leaving the yard on 22 August. She was towed by the tug  to New York City, where Plunger conducted trials near the home of President Theodore Roosevelt. Upon the submarine's arrival that afternoon, she moored alongside the tug and prepared for a visit from President Roosevelt.

President Roosevelt's visit 
The following morning, Plunger charged her batteries and made a series of five short dives before returning alongside Apache to recharge. Later that afternoon, Roosevelt boarded the Plunger and stayed aboard for almost two hours while she made another series of dives before returning to moor alongside the tug. Roosevelt spent almost another hour on board the submarine before he left.

Roosevelt's novel voyage prompted significant interest. On 6 September, Roosevelt wrote from Oyster Bay to Hermann Speck von Sternburg: "I myself am both amused and interested as to what you say about the interest excited about my trip in the Plunger. I went down in it chiefly because I did not like to have the officers and enlisted men think I wanted them to try things I was reluctant to try myself. I believe a good deal can be done with these submarines, although there is always the danger of people getting carried away with the idea and thinking that they can be of more use than they possibly could be." To another correspondent he declared that never in his life had he experienced "such a diverting day ... nor so much enjoyment in so few hours."

Later service 
Decommissioned on 3 November 1905, Plunger remained inactive until she was recommissioned on 23 February 1907. On 3 May 1909, Ensign Chester Nimitz, the future fleet admiral who would say he considered the submarines of the time "a cross between a Jules Verne fantasy and a humpbacked whale", assumed command of Plunger. That September, the submarine torpedo boat visited New York City to take part in the Hudson-Fulton celebrations.  Nimitz commanded Plunger until he assumed command of USS Snapper (later renamed C-5), when that submarine was commissioned on February 2, 1910.

Reassigned to the Charleston Navy Yard, Plunger reached that port on 24 October and moored alongside the gunboat , the tender for the Atlantic Submarine Flotilla. Shortly thereafter, Castines medical officer, Assistant Surgeon Micajah Boland, inspected Plunger and two other submarine torpedo boats. His report graphically described living conditions on these boats. He found "their sanitary condition to be far from satisfactory, notwithstanding the fact that they had been at sea only about forty-five hours."

Plunger was renamed A-1 on 17 November 1911. She was stricken from the Naval Vessel Register on 24 February 1913.

By 1916, A-1 had been authorized for use as an "experimental target, designated 'Target E'". Approximately 22 March 1918 she sank at New Suffolk, Massachusetts. Raised and sent to the Salvage Diving School at New London, Connecticut. She was ultimately hoisted on board the hulk of the former monitor  and authorized for sale in 1921, on an "as is, where is" basis. She was sold for scrapping on 26 January 1922.

References

Bibliography

External links 

history.navy.mil: USS Plunger
navsource.org: USS Plunger
hazegray.org: USS Plunger
 Lewis Nixon's Shipyard is acknowledged as place where first submarines were developed. Arthur Busch's role is mentioned and acknowledged as builder of Holland's submarines for Electric Boat Company.

 

Plunger-class submarines
Ships built in Elizabeth, New Jersey
1902 ships